Nisse may refer to:

 Nisse, Netherlands, a town in the municipality of Borsele
 Nisse (folklore), a mythical creature in Scandinavian mythology also known as Tomte
 Niels, a Scandinavian given name, as a pet form
 Nils, a Scandinavian given name, as a pet form

See also
 
 Nissedal, a municipality in the county of Telemark, Norway
 Nissa (disambiguation)